Yvo Van Herp (born 4 December 1949) is a Belgian footballer. He played in three matches for the Belgium national football team from 1973 to 1974.

References

External links
 

1949 births
Living people
Belgian footballers
Belgium international footballers
Place of birth missing (living people)
Association football forwards